These are the songs that reached number one on the Top 100 Best Sellers chart in 1960 as published by Cash Box magazine.

See also
1960 in music
List of Hot 100 number-one singles of 1960 (U.S.)

References
https://web.archive.org/web/20110818052118/http://cashboxmagazine.com/archives/60s_files/1960.html

1960
1960 record charts
1960 in American music